Oswaldo Ramsés Navarro [nah-vahr'-o] (born October 2, 1984 in Villa de Cura, Venezuela) is a former Major League Baseball shortstop. He was signed by the Seattle Mariners as a non-drafted free agent out of Venezuela on August 12, .

Career
In his first at-bat, he recorded a hit on a bunt. He was granted free agency in 2009 and signed a minor league contract with the Houston Astros on December 8, 2009.

Navarro was called up to the Astros on May 20, 2010 following the release of Kaz Matsui. On September 16, Navarro was designated for assignment to make room on the 40-man roster for Enerio Del Rosario. After clearing waivers, Navarro was outrighted to the Astros' AAA affiliate.

On March 17, 2012, Navarro signed a minor league deal with the New York Mets. Navarro spent the year at Double-A Binghamton before retiring.

Personal life
Navarro resides in Maracay, Venezuela with his wife, Angelica Gil, and their sons Oswaldo Andres and Darlín Andreina.

See also
 List of Major League Baseball players from Venezuela

Sources

External links
, or Retrosheet
Pelota Binaria (Venezuelan Winter League)

1984 births
Living people
Binghamton Mets players
Buffalo Bisons (minor league) players
Cardenales de Lara players
Everett AquaSox players
Houston Astros players
Major League Baseball players from Venezuela
Major League Baseball shortstops
Oklahoma City RedHawks players
People from Villa de Cura
Round Rock Express players
San Antonio Missions players
Seattle Mariners players
Tacoma Rainiers players
Venezuelan expatriate baseball players in the United States
West Tennessee Diamond Jaxx players
Wisconsin Timber Rattlers players